Neatnik Saucer is the patented high chair cover and baby place mat all-in-one. It prevents food and toys from falling to the floor while providing a sanitary barrier and clean activity space for infants and toddlers.  Neatnik is a lightweight, portable and collapsible juvenile product that is designed to fit primarily restaurant style high chairs and some home models.  It is suitable for use by parents of babies aged from six months to three years.

History
In 2007, the inventors, Danielle Batchelor and Cookie Centracco created the only product that covers the standard restaurant style high chair and extends onto the table like a place mat to prevent food and toys from falling to the floor. The product was also designed to provide a germ barrier by covering every thing within baby's reach such as the high chair itself and table surfaces.  It will function with some home high chair models as well. The Neatnik Saucer consists of a waterproof tray portion attached to a seat portion, with a flexible rim to catch spills and food.  Suction cups on the underside of the place mat section provide stability on smooth surfaces and straps secure toys, pacifiers and cups with handles. It is produced using child-safe fabrics that wipe clean easily.  The Neatnik Saucer is collapsible and folds up quickly into a small, useful bag. The Neatnik Saucer is currently manufactured and distributed by Coulson's Crib, LLC, a Houston, TX based company.

In 2010, the Neatnik Saucer was granted its (Utility) Patent.

Awards for Neatnik Saucer
Parent Tested Parent Approved Award Winner

National Parenting Center Seal of Approval Winner

The Lekotek Center Helping Children with Special Needs / AblePlay.org "Great Find" in all areas of Disability

Wes Watkins New Product and Process Fair - Grand Prize Winner Overall and First Place Winner in Small Business 2009

References

US Patent Information

Zibb.com  The Global Business Search Engine]

The Giggle Guide

External links
US Patent #7717504
Parent Tested Parent Approved Award 
The National Parenting Center Seal of Approval
Lekotek / AblePlay.org "Great Find"
Neatnik Saucer® Official Website
Philips Avent Baby Monitor Overview

Babycare